Thomas Barrett-Lennard may refer to:
 Sir Thomas Barrett-Lennard, 1st Baronet (1761–1857), British politician, MP for Essex South 1832–1835
 Thomas Barrett-Lennard (politician) (1788–1856), British Whig politician and MP, son of the above